AHBAP is a non-governmental organization founded by the Turkish musician and philanthropist Haluk Levent, based on solidarity and cooperation.

Levent's social media account's increase in the number of followers has emerged as a result of the studies he started with the intention of using this recognition to bring together people and organisations that can help people in need in Turkey.

Areas of work
AHBAP works in areas such as social aid, animal rights, humanitarian aid, natural disaster coordination and assistance.

Awards
 Üsküdar University 6th High Human Values ​​Awards (2021)
 Ministry of Culture and Tourism (2021)

References

External links
 

Non-governmental organizations
Foundations based in Turkey